The 2017 season was the Seattle Seahawks' 42nd in the National Football League (NFL) and their eighth under head coach Pete Carroll. The Seahawks tried to improve their 10–5–1 record from 2016. However, it did not happen because of injuries to key defensive players and poor offensive performances. After the Atlanta Falcons' Week 17 win over the Carolina Panthers, they were eliminated from playoff contention for the first time since 2011. They also failed to achieve a 10-win season for the first time since that same season. This was Russell Wilson's first season not making the playoffs.

During the season, Russell Wilson broke Eli Manning's NFL record for most 4th quarter touchdowns in a single season with 18; the previous record was 15. Wilson also led the NFL in touchdown passes with 34.

This was also the final season of the original Legion of Boom playing together, as well as the 21st and last full season under the ownership of Paul Allen, who died during the 2018 season.

Roster changes

Free agents

Unrestricted

Restricted

Exclusive-Rights

Signings

Trades

Draft

Draft trades

Undrafted free agents
All undrafted free agents were signed after the 2017 NFL Draft concluded on April 29, unless noted otherwise.

Staff

Final roster

Preseason

Regular season

Schedule

Note: Intra-division opponents are in bold text.

Game summaries

Week 1: at Green Bay Packers

Week 2: vs. San Francisco 49ers

Week 3: at Tennessee Titans

Week 4: vs. Indianapolis Colts
This would be the final game in Seattle for defensive end Cliff Avril, who would suffer a neck injury and be released after a failed physical in the offseason.

Week 5: at Los Angeles Rams

Week 7: at New York Giants

Week 8: vs. Houston Texans

Week 9: vs. Washington Redskins

Week 10: at Arizona Cardinals

In what would be his last game in Seattle, Richard Sherman ruptured his Achilles tendon, effectively ending his season and the Legion of Boom era. Kam Chancellor would also play his final game as he suffered a neck injury and would later announce his retirement in the offseason.

Week 11: vs. Atlanta Falcons

Week 12: at San Francisco 49ers

Week 13: vs. Philadelphia Eagles

Week 14: at Jacksonville Jaguars

Week 15: vs. Los Angeles Rams

Week 16: at Dallas Cowboys

Week 17: vs. Arizona Cardinals

With the loss, the Seahawks finished the season 9–7. This was the first season since 2011 the Seahawks failed to qualify for the playoffs. They also had a home record of 4-4, the worst of Russell Wilson's career. They would've still been eliminated even if they won, as the Falcons won their game.

This was also Bruce Arians' last game as head coach of the Arizona Cardinals.

Standings

Division

Conference

Team leaders

References

External links
 

Seattle
Seattle Seahawks seasons
Seattle Seahawks